William Murray (17 April 1882 – 12 November 1977) was an Australian athlete who competed in the 1912 Summer Olympics in Stockholm, Sweden.

Murray joined the Melbourne Harriers when he was a young man and started off in long distance running events, he is credited as winning the first ever marathon run in Melbourne in 1910. He took up racewalking when asked to enter a race due to a poor field in which he went on to win, over the next two weeks he won two more events and even beat the current Australian record holder. In 1911 he broke the Australasian record for the one mile which had stood for 15 years and also became Victorian champion at the three mile event, he won both events the next year also both in faster times, the NSWAAA (New South Wales Amateur Athletic Association) acknowledged his world record in the 3500 metre event of 14:49.4.

Later in 1912 he travelled to Stockholm, Sweden to compete in the 1912 Summer Olympics, he was entered in to the 10 km walk event, but due to some over zealous judging Murray was one of three athletes in his heat to be disqualified.

After the Olympics he carried on winning in Australia including the three mile Victorian Championship three more times, he carried on walking for most of his life, in 1922 he was one of the foundation members of the Victorian Amateur Walkers Club, in 1930 he became president of the Melbourne Harriers, and in 1971 when aged 90 years old he was Australia's oldest practicing solicitor and still walked to work four times a week.

References

1882 births
1977 deaths
Olympic athletes of Australasia
Athletes (track and field) at the 1912 Summer Olympics
Australian male racewalkers